Imam Nasr ad-Din was a Lamtuna Berber religious and military leader, who from 1644 to 1674 led an alliance of Sanhadja Berber tribes against the Maqil Arabs of the western Sahara desert (mainly today's Mauritania, southern Morocco and Western Sahara). 

Nasr ad-Din was killed in battle in 1674 and the Char Bouba war (or 30-years war) was lost by the Berber tribes. They were reduced to subordinate roles in the elaborate tribal hierarchy that was then developed by the Arabo-Berber Moorish people that resulted from the fusion between indigenous and immigrant peoples.

References

See also
 History of Mauritania
 History of Western Sahara

17th-century Berber people
History of Mauritania
History of Western Sahara
Berbers in Mauritania
Berbers in Western Sahara
Lamtuna